Algood United Methodist Church is a historic United Methodist church at 135 West Main Street in Algood, Tennessee.

The church was built in 1899 as a Methodist Episcopal Church, South. Land for the church was donated by brothers Alfred and Henry Algood, whose father was a circuit-riding Methodist minister. It is an example of the Carpenter Gothic architectural style. In 1909, a tornado caused extensive damage to the building. Restoration after the tornado included relocating the bell tower to the right-hand side of the building and installing the bell that still hangs there.

In its early years, the church building served as an unofficial community center for Algood and was sometimes used for worship services of other denominations.

The Algood Methodist Church building was added to the National Register of Historic Places in 1979.

References

External links
 [algoodumc.org Algood United Methodist Church website]

United Methodist churches in Tennessee
Carpenter Gothic church buildings in Tennessee
Churches on the National Register of Historic Places in Tennessee
Churches completed in 1899
19th-century Methodist church buildings in the United States
Buildings and structures in Putnam County, Tennessee
Southern Methodist churches in the United States
National Register of Historic Places in Putnam County, Tennessee